Ioannis Anagnostou (unknown – unknown) was a Greek chess player.

Biography
In the mid-1950s Ioannis Anagnostou was a leading Greek chess player. He played mainly in domestic chess tournaments and Greek Chess Championships.

Ioannis Anagnostou played for Greece in the Chess Olympiads:
 In 1952, at fourth board in the 10th Chess Olympiad in Helsinki (+0, =3, -3),
 In 1954, at second reserve board in the 11th Chess Olympiad in Amsterdam (+3, =7, -8).

References

External links

Ioannis Anagnostou chess games at 365chess.com

Year of birth missing
Year of death missing
Greek chess players
Chess Olympiad competitors
20th-century Greek people